Assia (born November 1, 1973, in Algiers) is an Algerian-born French singer with Kabyle origins. Her albums mixed pop, R&B and oriental music. She had great success with her hit singles "Elle est à toi" and "Là-bas".

Biography
At a young age, she spent twelve years at the classical conservatory in Créteil (near Paris), then a few years later obtained a law degree.

From 1998 to 1999, Assia participated in "Une Affaire de famille" with Stomy Bugsy, Passi and Doc Gynéco of the Sector A and the soundtracks of the movies Taxi and Kiss of the Dragon with the song "Ghir Dini".

In 2000, she released her first album entitled Chercheuse d'or (recorded in Paris, Toulouse and Los Angeles). Assia wrote the texts and his brother Khalil signed the music. Her first top single "Elle est à toi" (over 700,000 copies) was written in collaboration with Calbo of Arsenik. The second single is "Là-bas" (music video directed by J.G. Biggs).

In 2002, Assia played in the musical Cindy with Lââm in the lead role.

In 2003, she released a single with Beenie Man, "Street Life".

In 2005, Assia released her second album, Encore et Encore, recorded in Spain, whose second single "Politiquement Correct" was co-written with Diam's.

Discography

Albums

Singles

1 Duet with Doc Gyneco
2 Duet with Julien Clerc
3 Duet with Rohff
4 Duet with Beenie Man

References

External links
 Biography of Assia from Radio France Internationale

1973 births
20th-century Algerian women singers
Living people
Musicians from Algiers
Kabyle people
Algerian emigrants to France
French people of Kabyle descent
21st-century French women singers